John Percival Postgate, FBA (24 October 1853 – 15 July 1926) was an English classicist and professor of Latin at the University of Liverpool from 1909 to 1920.  He was a member of the Postgate family.

Born in Birmingham, the son of John Postgate, he was educated at King Edward's School where he became head boy. He won a scholarship to Trinity College, Cambridge, where he read classics, being elected a Fellow in 1878. He was elected as a member to the American Philosophical Society in 1886.

He established himself as a creative editor of Latin poetry with published editions of Propertius, Lucan, Tibullus and Phaedrus. His major work was the two-volume Corpus Poetarum Latinorum, a triumph of editorial organisation.  An influential work was his often reprinted "The New Latin Primer", 1888, much used in British schools over subsequent decades. While at Cambridge, he edited the Classical Review and the Classical Quarterly while holding the chair of comparative philology at University College, London. In 1909, reconciled that the Cambridge Chair would go to A. E. Housman, as it did in 1911, Postgate opted to become Professor of Latin at Liverpool.

He retired to Cambridge in 1920. On 14 July 1926 he was injured in a cycling accident and died of his injuries the following day.

Family
He married his graduate student Edith Allen and they had six children among whom were Raymond Postgate (a journalist, historian, novelist and food writer), and Margaret Cole (a Fabian politician); he was grandfather to the animator and puppeteer Oliver Postgate, and the microbiologist John Postgate FRS (1922–2014),

Published works
 The New Latin Primer (London, 1888)
 Sermo Latinus. A Short Guide to Latin Prose Composition (London, 1889; revised and enlarged ed. 1913)
 (ed.) Corpus Poetarum Latinorum, 2 vols. (London, 1905–1920)
 (ed.) Tibulli Aliorumque Carminum Libri Tres. Oxford Classical Texts (Oxford, 1905)
  (1908)
 (ed. and tr., with F.W. Cornish and J.W. Mackail) Catullus, Tibullus and Pervigilium Veneris. Loeb Classical Library (London, 1912)
 (ed. with notes) M. Annaei Lucani De Bello Civili Liber VII (Cambridge, 1917; rev. ed. by O.A.W. Dilke, Bristol, 1978) 
 (ed. with notes) M. Annaei Lucani De Bello Civili Liber VIII (Cambridge, 1917)
 Translation and Translations. Theory and Practice (London, 1922)
 Prosodia Latina. An Introduction to Classical Latin Verse (Oxford, 1923)
 A Short Guide to the Accentuation of Ancient Greek (Liverpool, 1924)
 (ed.) Phaedri Fabulae Aesopiae. Oxford Classical Texts (Oxford, 1934)

References

Further reading
 Todd, R. B. (ed.) (2004) Dictionary of British Classicists

External links
 
 

1853 births
1926 deaths
English classical scholars
People from Birmingham, West Midlands
Alumni of Trinity College, Cambridge
Fellows of Trinity College, Cambridge
Classical scholars of the University of Cambridge
Classical scholars of the University of Liverpool
Scholars of Latin literature
English male writers
John Percival
Fellows of the British Academy
Members of the American Philosophical Society
Presidents of the Classical Association